Leptodictyum is a genus of mosses belonging to the family Amblystegiaceae.

The genus has cosmopolitan distribution.

Species:
 Leptodictyum bandaiense (Broth. & Paris ex Takaki) Kanda
 Leptodictyum riparium

References

Amblystegiaceae
Moss genera